Mehrandu (also Romanized as Mehrāndū; also known as Mehrandūh) is a village in Kachu Rural District, in the Central District of Ardestan County, Isfahan Province, Iran. At the 2006 census, its population was 70, in 22 families.

References 

Populated places in Ardestan County